Balliol may refer to:

 House of Balliol, Lords of Baliol and their fief
 Balliol College, Oxford
 Balliol rhyme, a doggerel verse form with a distinctive meter, associated with Balliol College
 John Balliol (King John of Scotland) (1249–1314)
 John I de Balliol (1210–1269), his father
 Edward Balliol ( 1283–1364), his son, King of Scots

 Roussel de Bailleul (died 1077), Norman adventurer
 Boulton Paul Balliol, a British two-seat training aircraft